Piroboridava was a Dacian town mentioned by Ptolemy, and archaeologically identified at Poiana, Galați, Romania. Second part name of the city Dacian dava shows significance of the tribal city.

See also 
 Dacian davae
 List of ancient cities in Thrace and Dacia
 Dacia
 Roman Dacia

Notes

References

Ancient

Modern

Further reading 

Dacian towns
Dacian fortresses in Romania
Archaeological sites in Romania
History of Western Moldavia
Ruins in Romania
Historic monuments in Galați County